The Private Years is a box set released by Private Music in 1999. It features five of Yanni's albums for Private Music: Reflections of Passion,  In Celebration of Life, Dare to Dream, In My Time, and Live at the Acropolis, as well as the DVD of his concert film, Live at the Acropolis.

Track listing
Disc 1

Disc 2

Disc 3

Disc 4

Disc 5

DVD Track listing
 "Santorini"
 "Until the Last Moment"
 "Keys to Imagination"
 "The Rain Must Fall"
 "Felitsa"
 "Within Attraction"
 "One Man's Dream"
 "Marching Season"
 "Nostalgia"
 "Acroyali/Standing in Motion (Medley)"
 "Aria"
 "Reflections of Passion"
 "Swept Away"
 "The End of August"

Personnel

Performers
Charlie Adams – acoustic and electronic drums
Osama Afifi – bass
Charlie Bisharat – violin
Karen Briggs – violin
Michael Bruno – percussion
Ric Fierabracci – bass
Endre Granat – violin
Julie Homi – keyboards
Bradley Joseph – keyboards
Sachi McHenry – cello
Mona Lisa  – vocals
Shardad Rohani – conductor

Production
 Peter Baumann –  producer
 Chris Bellman – mastering
 Richard Boukas – arranger
 Jeff Buswell – drums/bass technician
 Dione Dirito – publicity
 Bryan Faris
 Peter Feldman – stage manager
 Lynn Goldsmith – photography
 Bernie Grundman – mastering
 Tom Hanlon – stage manager
 David "Gurn" Kaniski  – artwork, production coordination
 Curtis Kelly  – monitor engineer
 Jeff D. Klein –  management
 Diane Kramer  – numerical editing, tour accountant
 Tracy Kunstmann  – sound technician
 Peter Maher  – keyboard technician
 Kevin Mazur – photography
 Tod Metz – lighting technician
 Norman Moore – artwork, art direction
 Andy Rose  – recorder
 Lee Rose –  video director
 Paul Serault –  monitor mixer
 Jerry Steckling – engineer
 Tom Sterling – mixing
 Gus Thomson – lighting supervisor
Yanni – producer, engineer, mixing

References

External links
Official Website

Yanni albums
1999 compilation albums